The Handball competition at the 2007 All-Africa Games was held in Algiers, Algeria between 14 July and 21 July 2007.

Men

Pool A

Pool B

Play-off 

Semifinals:
Algeria ( 30 - 28 ) Tunisia
Egypt ( 29 - 23 ) Angola

3rd place final:
Tunisia ( 34 - 31 ) Angola

Final:
 Egypt ( 29 - 21 ) Algeria

Women

Pool A

Pool B

Play-off 

Semifinals:
Angola ( 37 - 21 ) Cameroon
Congo ( 32 - 26 ) Côte d'Ivoire

3rd place final:
Côte d'Ivoire ( 25 - 24 ) Cameroon

Final:
Angola ( 35 - 22 ) Congo

References 
https://web.archive.org/web/20070704022901/http://www.coja2007.dz/
International Handball Federation: , 

2007 in handball
2007 All-Africa Games
Handball
2007 in African handball